The 1898 Drexel Dragons football team was head coached by D. Leroy Reeves.  The team went undefeated, and allowed 0 points against the entire season.

Schedule

Roster

References

Drexel
Drexel Dragons football seasons
College football undefeated seasons
Drexel Dragons football